Helminthostachys is a fern genus in the Ophioglossaceae (Adder's tongue) family. It is widespread throughout southeast Asia and Australia.

References

Ophioglossaceae
Fern genera